Drømmebroer (lit. Dream Bridges) is a 2000 poetry collection by Danish poet Henrik Nordbrandt. It won the 2000 Nordic Council's Literature Prize.

References

2000 poetry books
Danish poetry collections
Nordic Council's Literature Prize-winning works